Sean Doyle (born 3 September 1957) is an Irish boxer. He competed in the men's lightweight event at the 1980 Summer Olympics.

References

1957 births
Living people
Irish male boxers
Olympic boxers of Ireland
Boxers at the 1980 Summer Olympics
Place of birth missing (living people)
Lightweight boxers